Wreck Chasers is an American reality television show on TLC about tow truckers competing in Philadelphia, Pennsylvania to claim wrecks and collect cash.

Cast
 Michelle Alvarado
 P.J. and Pam Augustine
 Mickey Caban
 Redz Eliot
 Little Man

References

External links
 
 

2010 American television series debuts
2010s American reality television series
English-language television shows
TLC (TV network) original programming
Tow trucks
Television shows set in Philadelphia